Carrie Babcock Sherman (November 16, 1856 – October 6, 1931) was the wife of Vice President James S. Sherman, and thus second lady of the United States from 1909 to 1912.

Carrie was the daughter of Lewis Hamilton Babcock, a prominent attorney, and Ellen Catherine Babcock (née Sherrill). She had two siblings, Sherrill Babcock, a soldier, and Anita Babcock DeLong. Her grandfather was Congressman and Union brigade commander Eliakim Sherrill, killed at Gettysburg.

Carrie Babcock married James Schoolcraft Sherman on January 26, 1881.  Carrie and James had known each other since childhood.

The couple had three sons: Sherrill B. Sherman (1883–1962), Richard U. Sherman (1884–1951), and Thomas M. Sherman (1885–1944).

When her husband became vice-president in March 1909, Carrie became the first second lady to accompany her spouse in the inaugural parade, riding to and from the ceremony at the U.S. Capitol.

Sherman is buried at Forest Hill Cemetery in Utica, New York, alongside her husband.

References

1856 births
1931 deaths
Second ladies of the United States
Spouses of New York (state) politicians
People from Utica, New York
Sherman family (U.S.)
Burials in New York (state)
19th-century American women
20th-century American women